Francesco Aquilini (born 1969) is a Canadian businessman, investor, and philanthropist and is the current chairman of the Vancouver Canucks. He is a managing director of Vancouver-based Aquilini Investment Group, the parent company of several diverse subsidiaries. The company is best known for its ownership of the Vancouver Canucks and Rogers Arena, where Aquilini sits as Chairman and NHL Governor. Aquilini is also chairman of Canadian digital media company Enthusiast Gaming.

Early life and family business 
Francesco Aquilini was born and raised in Vancouver, British Columbia. Aquilini attended Templeton Secondary School. He went on to graduate from Simon Fraser University with a degree in Business Administration. He later earned an MBA from UCLA.

His father, Luigi Aquilini, emigrated from Travagliato, Brescia, Italy, to Vancouver in 1953. He started Aquilini Investment Group in the 1960s and is still active in the company operations and decision making. Having come to Canada from Italy in the mid-1950s, Luigi started his own construction company, working in East Vancouver during the 1960s and 1970s. In the 1980s, he bought and sold older buildings in Vancouver, Ontario and Quebec. He then began buying land to build new condominium towers. Francesco and his two brothers, Roberto and Paolo, began working in the company during the 1980s and are now all managing directors.

In May 2019, it was found that the Aquilini family had underpaid 174 migrant workers at their berry farm in Pitt Meadows. The office of the Director of Employment Standards ordered the Aquilinis to repay $133,632.56 in back wages, vacation pay and interest to temporary foreign workers brought in from Guatemala to work at its Golden Eagle Blueberry Farm in the summer of 2018.

Aquilini Investment Group 
Aquilini, along with his brothers and father, oversees several subsidiaries:

Vancouver Canucks and Rogers Arena 
The Canucks are a professional ice hockey team based in Vancouver. On November 17, 2004, Aquilini purchased a 50% share in Orca Bay Sports and Entertainment (the owners of both the Canucks franchise and Rogers Arena) from John McCaw, Jr. On November 8, 2006,  Aquilini purchased the remaining 50% of the Vancouver Canucks and Rogers Arena. In May 2007, Gaglardi and Beedie's civil lawsuit over Aquilini's purchase reached the Supreme Court of British Columbia. The court ruled for Aquilini, on January 10, 2008. The court held that there was no legal partnership between Aquilini, Beedie, and Gaglardi, and that McCaw was free to sell the team to anyone he wished. Aquilini and Gaglardi knew each other from the many joint family events they had attended over the years. Their fathers (Luigi and Bob) were longtime friends and commercial allies. Both families are still majority partners in the  proposed Garibaldi At Squamish resort north of Vancouver.

Aquilini Developments 
Aquilini Developments owns and develops real estate. The company is primarily focused on Vancouver and the Lower Mainland, but has holdings across Canada, in the US, and Italy. Recent residential and mixed use developments in Greater Vancouver include Tsawwassen Shores in Delta, Seymour Village in North Vancouver, and the Willingdon Lands redevelopment in Burnaby. The company has also built two residential towers around Rogers Arena. Other recent acquisitions include an acre of land in downtown Moncton, NB  and a golf course redevelopment and commercial land in Chilliwack, BC.

Aquilini Developments, in partnership with the Gaglardi family, is the proponent of the proposed $2.6B Garibaldi at Squamish resort.

Aquilini Properties 
Aquilini Properties owns and manages hotels and other income-producing properties across Canada.  Aquilini Properties owns five office towers across Canada and has half ownership of Halifax-based Pacrim Hospitality Services, which owns and manages 30 hotels across Canada. These include the Embassy Suites hotel in Montreal, the Holiday Inn Express in East Vancouver, The division also owns all 48 Pizza Hut locations in BC.

The company previously owned one of the largest rental complexes in Canada, the West Edmonton village.

Golden Eagle Group 
Golden Eagle Group operates a variety of recreational and agricultural businesses within  of prime agricultural land. This is the single largest land holding in the Greater Vancouver Area. This includes two 18-hole golf courses, a western town movie set, real estate, and a  hardwood tree nursery. The Group also owns and manages one of the world's larger blueberry and cranberry growing and processing operations.

Aquilini Renewable Energy 
Aquilini Renewable Energy, led by John Negrin, is looking for opportunities in green energy, including waste-to-power and wind power. The division earned community and media attention for a proposal in 2008 and 2009 to build a petroleum waste reduction and recycling plant near Christina Lake, a lake that is popular with summer vacationers.

Personal life and philanthropy 
Aquilini has undertaken philanthropic work in British Columbia, through both his personal contributions and the charitable organizations founded by his family through their various business ventures.

Aquilini  is the Chair and primary sponsor of the Italian Gardens (Il Giardino Italiano) in Hastings Park. His company has given significant support to the BC Children's Hospital. Francesco is also a regular participant and contributor to the East End Boys Club, which provides mentorship for at-risk young men in BC.

The Aquilini Investment Group also supports land conservation and wildlife habitat protection, including contributing to the purchase of the Codd Wetlands in Pitt Meadows to protect the area. Additionally, a  site adjacent to Blaney Bog Regional Park was renamed the Aquilini Land Conservancy to recognize their significant financial contribution that helped permanently protect the area.

Under the Canucks brand, Aquilini  has hosted many charity groups at Canucks games and supports a number of charitable organizations, including: the Canucks for Kids Fund, to support childhood health and wellness, with specific programs aimed at issues like childhood diabetes; the Canucks Autism Network (CAN), which provides adaptive sports, recreational, social and arts programs for children, teens and young adults living with autism in British Columbia; and the Canuck Place Children's Hospice, which provides care for sick children in BC.

In his early 20s, Aquilini married Dusty Martel, then a local radio personality at CFMI. They had one child but were soon divorced. In 1994, he married Taliah Aquilini and the couple had four children together. They divorced in 2013.

On September 27, 2022, three of Aquilini’s children testified in sworn affidavits before BC Supreme Court that they had been physically abused by their father. Aquilini denied the allegations.

See also
 Canucks Sports & Entertainment
 Vancouver Canucks

References

External links
Canucks.com Official Page
Vancouver Sun

1969 births
Businesspeople from Vancouver
Canadian chief executives
Canadian investors
Canadian people of Italian descent
21st-century Canadian philanthropists
Canadian real estate businesspeople
Living people
National Hockey League executives
National Hockey League owners
People associated with wind power
Simon Fraser University alumni
Ice hockey people from Vancouver
UCLA Anderson School of Management alumni
Vancouver Canucks executives
Templeton Secondary School alumni
Vancouver Titans